Burton Millard (1828April 7, 1862) was an American machinist and Republican politician.  He served one term in the Wisconsin State Assembly.  He died at the Siege of Yorktown during the American Civil War.

Biography

Born in Scio, New York, Millard moved to Wausau, Wisconsin. He owned a machine shop. In 1855, he served as Sheriff of Marathon County, Wisconsin, and coroner of the county. In 1858, Millard served in the Wisconsin State Assembly. He served as a commissary sergeant in the 5th Wisconsin Infantry Regiment during the American Civil War and was killed while on duty in Lee's Mill Earthworks, Virginia.

Notes

1828 births
1862 deaths
People from Allegany County, New York
Politicians from Wausau, Wisconsin
People of Wisconsin in the American Civil War
Businesspeople from Wisconsin
Wisconsin sheriffs
Members of the Wisconsin State Assembly
19th-century American politicians
19th-century American businesspeople
Union Army non-commissioned officers
Union military personnel killed in the American Civil War
United States politicians killed during the Civil War